Gus Brown may refer to:

 Gus Brown (actor) (born 1974), English actor and comedian
 R. M. Brown, (1885–1927), American football, basketball, and baseball coach

See also
 Gus Malietoa-Brown (born 1975), Western Samoa rugby league footballer